Tom Casiello is an American writer.  Casiello has written content for three distinct entertainment genres. 

Casiello began his career as a soap opera writer, working on a number of shows as a staff writer. 

He was then hired by WWE, where he served as the creative writer from 2011 to 2016. 

In recent years, Casiello has written for Gen-Z Media, where he was part of the writing team for Six Minutes, as well as stints on the Apex and Respawn creative teams.

Positions held
Another World
Writers’ Intern (1998–1999)

As the World Turns
Breakdown Writer (2000–2002)
Assistant to the Writers (1999–2002)
 
Days of Our Lives
Associate Head Writer (January 22, 2007 – January 24, 2008)
 
One Life to Live
Breakdown Writer (October 27, 2004 – August 1, 2006)
Script Writer (September 22, 2004 – October 26, 2004) [Note: On air credit error made by the show – Casiello did not write any scripts]
 
The Young and the Restless
Breakdown Writer (April 20, 2009 – May 27, 2011)
Occasional Breakdown Writer (September 6, 2006 – October 25, 2006)

Apex Legends
 Writer.

WWE
Creative Writer (April 17, 2011 – December 9, 2016)

Awards and nominations
Daytime Emmy Awards
NOMINATION (2006; Best Writing; One Life to Live)
WIN (2001 & 2002; Best Writing; As The World Turns)

Writers Guild of America Award
NOMINATION (2005 Season; One Life to Live)

References

American soap opera writers
American male television writers
Year of birth missing (living people)
Living people